Maharaja Nahar Singh (26 December 1672 – 6 December 1697) was first son of Maharaja Suraj Singh, Maharaja princely state BhartpurHis mother was Veena Devi.

He was the next successor chosen by his father. He proclaimed at Jhunjhunu by General Balla Singh on receipt of news of his father's death, 26 December 1672. But he was opposed by Maharani Veena and the chief nobles of the state.

Later, in Sikar he died by natural causes, 6 December 1697.

References
Dr Natthan Singh: Jat – Itihas (Hindi), Jat Samaj Kalyan Parishad Gwalior, 2004

Rulers of Bharatpur state
1766 deaths
Year of birth unknown
1672 births